Terasa Livingstone (born 9 April 1975) is an Australian theatre, film and television actress, TV presenter and children's host.  She lives in Los Angeles with her husband, fellow Australian actor Wil Traval.

Career
She began her career as a roving reporter for Agro's Cartoon Connection on the Seven Network, eventually taking over the role of co-host from Ann-Maree Biggar in 1995. She also served as a reporter for Seven's The Great Outdoors. In the late 1990s she moved to the United States, appearing in several minor roles including the 2005 film Circadian Rhythm and a part on the first season finale of Lost. She has also posed for the men's magazines FHM, Inside Sport, and in 1998 appeared nude for the art magazine Black+White alongside former fiancée Jamie Durie.

In 2006 she hosted the Australian celebrity singing competition It Takes Two with Grant Denyer.

External links
 

1975 births
Australian film actresses
Australian stage actresses
Australian television actresses
Living people
Australian children's television presenters
Australian women television presenters